Madrasa El Bechiria is one of the madrasahs of the medina of Tunis., which was constructed during the Husainid Dynasty and was attached to a zawiya.

Etymology 
The madrasa is named after Sheikh Mohamed Al Bechir Al Zouaoui, who was an important Rahmaniyya tariqa scholar, who died in Tunis in 1826.

Location 

The madrasa is located on the Sidi El Bechir Street, in the southern suburb of the medina of Tunis.

History 
The madrasa was dedicated to students from the Zouaoua tribe who followed the Rahmaniyya tariqa. It was built with a mausoleum in 1824 (1240 Hijri) by Al-Husayn II ibn Mahmud. It was managed by the son of Sheikh Al Bechir after his death.

Description 
The madrasa contains seven rooms and a mosque.

Evolution 
After the Tunisian independence, this madrasa was destroyed as part of restorations on Sidi El Bechir Street.

Students 
Among students of this madarsa, we can find the historian Ahmad ibn Abi Diyaf who assisted tafsir classes (Quran explanations) taught by Al Bechir in person.

Bibliography

References 

Bechiria